, also known by his street name , was a Japanese film director who primarily worked in popular genres like the jidaigeki. Mori directed over 100 films in his life.

Career
Born in Ehime Prefecture, Mori graduated from Kyoto University before joining Nikkatsu's Uzumasa studio in 1933. A favorite of the producer Masaichi Nagata, he followed him to Daiichi Eiga and Shinkō Kinema before getting a chance to direct in 1936 with Adauchi hizakurige. When Shinkō Kinema was merged with other studios to form Daiei Film, Mori became one of Daiei's core directors of genre films, making primarily samurai films with stars such as Raizō Ichikawa, Kazuo Hasegawa, and Shintaro Katsu. While not an auteur, he was a solid craftsman in the genre. After Daiei went bankrupt in the early 1970s, Mori continued directing jidaigeki on television. He directed over 130 films in his career. The National Film Center in Tokyo did a retrospective of his works in 2011 in celebration of his centenary.

Filmography

Film

Selected filmography

Television

Bibliography

References

External links 
 

Japanese film directors
Samurai film directors
1911 births
1989 deaths
People from Matsuyama, Ehime
Kyoto University alumni